Seppelt is a German surname. Notable people with the surname include:

Benno Seppelt (1846–1931), South Australian winemaker, son of Joseph
Hajo Seppelt (born 1963), German journalist
Joseph Ernst Seppelt (1813–1868), founder of Seppeltsfield and the Seppelt winery in South Australia
Konrad Seppelt, (born 1944) German chemist, Vice President of the Free University of Berlin

See also
Seppeltsfield (disambiguation)

German-language surnames